is a Japanese baseball player. He was awarded the bronze medal, along with the rest of the Japanese team, during baseball's first ever appearance as an official Olympic sport, during the 1992 Summer Olympics.

References

Baseball players at the 1992 Summer Olympics
Olympic baseball players of Japan
Living people
Olympic medalists in baseball
Year of birth missing (living people)
Medalists at the 1992 Summer Olympics
Olympic bronze medalists for Japan